Angela Margaret Cartwright (born September 9, 1952) is a British actress primarily known for her roles in movies and television.  On television, she played Linda Williams, the stepdaughter of Danny Williams (played by Danny Thomas) in the long-running TV series The Danny Thomas Show, and Penny Robinson in the 1960s television series Lost in Space.  Cartwright's most famous movie role was the part of Brigitta von Trapp in the film The Sound of Music (1965).  Her older sister is actress Veronica Cartwright.

Early life and career
Angela Cartwright was born in Altrincham, Cheshire, England, in 1952.  She made her first film appearance at the age of three years as Paul Newman's character's daughter in Somebody Up There Likes Me (1956), and appeared with Rock Hudson and Sidney Poitier in Something of Value (1957). After moving to the United States, Cartwright appeared for seven seasons in the CBS TV series The Danny Thomas Show, opposite comedian Danny Thomas. She remained close to Thomas after the series' cancellation until his death on February 6, 1991.

Cartwright played the role of Brigitta von Trapp in The Sound of Music (1965). The film won five Academy Awards and eclipsed Gone with the Wind as the highest-grossing film of all-time.

Cartwright played Penny Robinson in the TV series Lost in Space (1965–68). She made appearances on several TV shows, including My Three Sons, Adam-12, and The Love Boat. She was also cast in the television movies Scout's Honor (1980) and played the role of Miss D'Angelo in High School U.S.A. (1983).

She played Theresa Mazzetti in Beyond the Poseidon Adventure (1979), directed by Lost in Space producer Irwin Allen. Cartwright made a cameo appearance as Reporter #2 in the 1998 Lost in Space film and as Dr. Smith's mother in the third episode of the second season of the 2018 Netflix reimagined Lost In Space series.

Personal life
Cartwright married Steve Gullion in 1976. They have two children.

She has been a photographer for 30 years. Her work is displayed at her studio in Studio City, Los Angeles.

Filmography

Film

Television

Books and publications 
Pasticcio quartz is a bi-annual journal written and published by Sarah Fishburn and Angela Cartwright. Issue Number 1 was 52, full-color glossy 8.5 by 8.5 inch, pages and was published on July 23, 2007. The most current, 60 page issue (Number 15: January 10, 2014), retains the size and full-color attributes.

 In This House: A Collection of Altered Art Imagery and Collage Techniques (2007)
 Mixed Emulsions: Altered Art Techniques for Photographic Imagery (2007)
 In This Garden: Exploration in Mixed-Media Visual Narrative (2009)
 "Lineage: A Personal & Private Journey", Somerset Studio magazine (Mar/Apr 2014) 
 Styling the Stars: Lost Treasures from the Twentieth Century Fox Archive (2014), Angela Cartwright and Tom McLaren, foreword by Maureen O'Hara 
Styling the Stars, IBPA 2015 Benjamin Franklin Awards, Gold Winner, Cover Design: Large Format
Styling the Stars: Lost Treasures from the Twentieth Century Fox Archive (Softcover 2017), Angela Cartwright and Tom McLaren, foreword by Maureen O'Hara
 'On Purpose: A Novel by Angela Cartwright and Bill Mumy' (2018)
Lost (and Found) in Space 2: Blast Off into the Expanded Edition by Angela Cartwright and Bill Mumy (2021)

References

External links

 
 Art Studio web site
 Angela Cartwright interview at Classic Film & TV Cafe
 

1952 births
Living people
People from Altrincham
English emigrants to the United States
English child actresses
English film actresses
English television actresses
20th-century English actresses
21st-century English actresses